|}

The Gowran Park Champion Chase is a Grade 2 National Hunt chase in Ireland which is open to horses aged five years or older. It is run at Gowran Park over a distance of about 2 miles and 4 furlongs (4,023 metres), and it is scheduled to take place each year in October.

The race was first run in 1998.

Records
Most successful horse (4 wins):
 Sizing Europe – 2011, 2012, 2013, 2014

Most successful jockey (4 wins):
 Barry Geraghty – Ferbet Junior (1999), Barrow Drive (2002), Kicking King (2004), Cailin Annamh (2015)

Most successful trainer (5 wins): 
 Jessica Harrington – Ferbet Junior (1999), 	Slaney Native (2000), Knight Legend (2008), Cailin Annamh (2015), Woodland Opera (2018)

Winners

See also
 Horse racing in Ireland
 List of Irish National Hunt races

References
 Racing Post:

National Hunt races in Ireland
National Hunt chases
Gowran Park Racecourse
Recurring sporting events established in 1998
1998 establishments in Ireland